Benjamin Waterhouse (born 11 June 1985) is an American Samoan judoka.

Waterhouse competed at the 2016 Summer Olympics in Rio de Janeiro, representing American Samoa in the men's 73 kg weight category, where he was eliminated by Chamara Repiyallage of Sri Lanka in the second round of competition losing 000-101.

References

External links
 

1985 births
Living people
American people of Samoan descent
American Samoan male judoka
Olympic judoka of American Samoa
Judoka at the 2016 Summer Olympics